Bhawal Estate was the second largest zamindari in Bengal (in modern-day Gazipur, Bangladesh) until it was abolished according to East Bengal State Acquisition and Tenancy Act of 1950.

History 
In the late 17th century, Daulat Ghazi was the zamindar of the Ghazi estate of Bhawal. Bala Ram was Diwan of Daulat Ghazi. In 1704, as the consequence of change in the policy of revenue collectionm, Bala Ram's son Sri Krishna was installed as the zamindar of Bhawal by Murshid Quli Khan. Since then, through acquisitions the zamindari expanded. The family turned into the proprietor of the whole Bhawal pargana after purchasing the zamindari of J. Wise, an indigo grower for Rs 4,46,000.

In 1878, British Raj conferred Raja title to Zamindar Kalinarayan Roy Chowdhury. His son Raja Rajendra Narayan Roy Chowdhury extended the zamindari. Rajendra was married to Rani Bilasmani Devi. They had 3 daughters - Indumayi, Jyotirmayi and Tarinmayi, and 3 sons - Ranendra Narayan, Ramendra Narayan and Rabindra Narayan. Writer Kaliprosanna Ghosh was appointed the Dewan of Bhawal Estate for Rajendra Narayan. Rajendra died in 1901.

Area 
The estate comprised over 1,500 kilometer including 2,274 villages and around 55,000 villagers. Its biggest establishment is the Bhawal Rajbari palace. Bhawal Temple and Shoshan Ghaat (cremating area) are situated to the south of the palace.

References

Bengali zamindars
Zamindari estates
Bengali Hindus
Bangladeshi Hindus
Hindu families